Amatsukaze may refer to:

Ships
 , an Imperial Japanese Navy  launched in 1916, completed in 1917, and scrapped in 1935
 , an Imperial Japanese Navy Kagerō-class destroyer launched in 1939 and commissioned in 1940 that served in World War II and was sunk in 1945
 , a Japan Maritime Self-Defense Force destroyer, the only one of her class, launched in 1963 and in commission from 1965 to 1995

People
 Amatsukaze Masao (born 1937), Japanese sumo wrestler